Gordon Frederick Arnold (22 January 1920 - 30 December 1999) was a British linguist and Emeritus Reader in Phonetics at University College London.

Biography

Born in 1920 in Braintree, Essex, Arnold read French at University College London. In 1947 he was appointed Assistant Lecturer in the Department of Phonetics by the head of department Daniel Jones. During his life he played a substantial role in the administration of the college, becoming Senior Tutor in 1979.

Books
 Arnold, G.F. and Gimson, A.C (1965). English Pronunciation Practice. London: University of London Press
 Intonation of Colloquial English, with J. D. O'Connor (Longman, 1961; second edition, 1973)
 English Words (North-Holland, 1957) 
 Say it with Rhythm, with O.M. Tooley (Longman, three parts, 1971–73)

See also
Daniel Jones (phonetician)
A. C. Gimson

References

1920 births
1999 deaths
Linguists from England
British phonologists
Phoneticians
Linguists of English
Academics of University College London